Großheubach (or Grossheubach) is a market community in the Miltenberg district in the Regierungsbezirk of Lower Franconia (Unterfranken) in Bavaria, Germany.

Geography

Location 
Großheubach lies on the right bank of the Main. The community is located on the slopes of the Mittelgebirge Spessart. The highest point in the municipal area is the 439 m-high Ospisrain. Großheubach is located on the Fränkischer Rotwein Wanderweg ("Franconian Red Wine Hiking Trail"). Across the Main lie the hills of the Odenwald.

Subdivisions
The hamlets of Klotzenhof and Roßhof are part of the municipality Großheubach.

History 
Earlier names for Großheubach are Heidebah (mentioned in 878) and Grotzenheidbach (1358). Großheubach derives from the name of the stream Heubach which flows into the Main here. The area was settled by 1000 BC, as witnessed by urnfields and graves. Local wine growing is first mentioned in the 11th century AD. As of the late 12th century, the place was held by the Lords of Klingenberg. In 1291, the Teutonic Knights purchased the village and its surroundings. About 1300, the community's first wooden chapel was built on the Rulesberg (hill), now known as the Engelberg. From 1483, Großheubach belonged to the Archbishopric of Mainz.

In 1612, the historic town hall was built.

In 1803, the Archbishopric of Mainz was secularized. By way of the Grand Duchy of Frankfurt, Großheubach came to the Kingdom of Bavaria in 1816. In 1828, Kloster Engelberg was taken over by the Franciscans.

In 1896, the old town church was expanded and today's parish church thereby came into being.

Governance

Community council 

The local council has 20 members (Elections in 2020):
 CSU: 7 seats
 Freie Wähler: 5 seats
 Heimat mit Zukunft: 5 seats
 SPD: 3 seats

Mayors 

Gernot Winter (CSU): Mayor since May 2020.
Former mayors:
Josef Zipf: 1933 - 1940
Felix Straub: 1940 - 1942
Anton Blatz: 1942 - 1945
Otto Kempf: 1945 - 1946
Josef Heinrich Wolf: 1946 - 1948
Richard Galmbacher: 1948 - 1967
Franz Hegmann: 1967 - 1990
Günther Oettinger: 1990 - 2020

Coat of arms 
The community's arms might be described thus: Per pale, argent a saltire pattée sable and gules a wheel spoked of six of the first.

The black saltire (X-shaped cross) comes from a village court seal from 1654 and refers to the hegemony once exercised by the Teutonic Knights (although their coat of arms showed an upright cross). The Wheel of Mainz and the tinctures argent and gules (silver and red) refer to the community's later feudal overlord, the Archbishopric of Mainz, which held Großheubach until the end of the Old Empire in 1803.

The arms have been borne since 1956.

Culture and sightseeing

Buildings

Saint Peter’s parish church 
In 1247, the church had its first priest, and in 1519, it acquired its first bell. In 1609, a massive fortress church was built in the Romanesque style with defensive towers, parapets and battlements. Between 1895 and 1897, the church underwent remodelling, giving it its current appearance. In 1949, the church acquired four bells. On 1 August 1958, the churchtower was destroyed in a storm. In 1987, the church was renovated.

Historic town hall 

This was built in 1611 and 1612 by master builder Otto Oswald Heppeler in Old Franconian timber-frame style. The house served as a seat for a lower official of the Amt of Prozelten. The ground floor was used as a prison. Functioning as the house's owners were Johann Schweikhard von Kronberg, Archbishop of Mainz and Elector, and Caspar Herr zu Eltz, Electoral Mainz Großhofmeister, councilman and Amtmann at Prozelten.

Abendanz’sches Haus 
The Abendanz’sches Haus is a timber-frame house in Großheubach core built around 1600. Over the centuries, several conversions to the building were undertaken. After the restorations done between 1987 and 1990, the timber framing was exposed and the original façade was reconstructed. The house served as a dwelling for, among others, the wine merchant Johann Simon Abendanz and the last abbot of the Amorbach Abbey.

Engelberg Abbey
The Franciscan Kloster Engelberg with its well-known pilgrimage church was founded about 1300. The building, built in 1630 for the Order of Friars Minor Capuchin, was on King Ludwig I's orders turned over to the Bavarian Franciscans, who still run the abbey today. The Engelberg, the hill on which the monastery stands, which is 250 m above sea level, can be reached over the 612 so-called Engelstaffeln (roughly, "Angel's Steps") made out of bunter.

Hunnenstein
Once considered a possible heathen cult site, the natural sandstone known as Hunnenstein or Heunenschüssel, is found on a hill ridge near Engelberg Abbey, close to the Eselsweg.

Notable people

Sons and daughters of the town 
 Guido Kratschmer (b. 10 January 1953), decathlete and Olympic medallist

References

External links 

 Municipal website

Miltenberg (district)